Zayed Sultan (born 11 April 2001), is an Emirati professional footballer who plays as a right back for UAE Pro League side Al Jazira.

Career statistics

Club

References

External links
 

2001 births
Living people
Emirati footballers
Association football fullbacks
Al Jazira Club players
UAE Pro League players